Mekong Review is a quarterly English-language literary magazine on Southeast Asian literature, especially Cambodian literature, Burmese literature, Vietnamese literature, Laotian literature, and Thai literature. It was founded by Minh Bui Jones, a Vietnamese-born Australian-based journalist, in Phnom Penh, Cambodia, and is based in Sydney, Australia.

References

External links
mekongreview.com (official site)

English-language magazines
Literary magazines published in Australia
Literary translation magazines
Magazines established in 2015
Magazines published in Sydney
Quarterly magazines published in Australia
Poetry literary magazines